Kambot  Ap Ma (Ap Ma Botin, Botin, also Karaube), is a Keram language of Papua New Guinea. Compared to its nearest relative, Ambakich, Kambot drops the first segment from polysyllabic words.

Kambot is spoken in Kambot village, Keram Rural LLG, East Sepik Province.

Classification
Kambot was assigned to the Grass family within Ramu by Laycock and Z'graggen (1975). Foley (2005) finds the data does not support this assignment, but re-adds them to the Grass family in 2018. Foley and Ross (2005) agree that the language belongs to the Ramu – Lower Sepik family. Usher restores it to the Ramu family, but closer to the Mongol–Langam languages.

Phonology
Ap Ma consonants are:

{| 
| p || t || k || 
|-
| ᵐb || ⁿd || ᶮʤ || ᵑg
|-
| m || n || ɲ || ŋ
|-
|  || s ||  || 
|-
|  || r ~ l ||  || 
|-
| w || j ||  || 
|}

Pronouns
Foley (1986) proposed that Kambot had borrowed its pronouns from the Iatmul language of the Sepik family (Ndu languages). His suggestion was that nyɨ 'I' (1sg), wɨn 'thou' (2sg), and nun 'ye' (2pl) are taken from Iatmul nyɨn 'thou', wɨn 'I', and nɨn 'we', with a crossover of person. That is, the Iatmul may have called the Kambot nyɨn "you", and they then used that pronoun for themselves, resulting in it meaning "I". However, Ross (2005) and Pawley (2005) show  that the pronoun set has not been borrowed. The Kambot pronouns are indigenous, as they have apparent cognates in Ramu languages. Similarly, the Iatmul pronouns have not been borrowed from Kambot, as they have cognates in other Ndu languages.

References

 
 
 
 

Keram languages
Languages of East Sepik Province
Language isolates of New Guinea